Clube de Futebol Os Belenenses, commonly known as Os Belenenses, is a Portuguese sports club best known for its football team. Founded in 1919, it is one of the oldest Portuguese sports clubs. It is based in the 25,000-seat Estádio do Restelo in Belém, Lisbon, hence the club name, which translates as "The ones from Belém". Among its fanbase, the club is commonly nicknamed O Belém, in reference to the neighborhood; Os Pastéis (The Pastries), in reference to a traditional Portuguese pastry originated in Belém; Azuis (Blues) or Azuis do Restelo (The Blues from Restelo), in reference to the club's color and its home stadium; and A Cruz de Cristo (The Order of Christ Cross), for its emblem, or also "Os Rapazes da Praia" (The Boys of the Beach), a reference to the zone of Belém in the earlier 20th century.

Os Belenenses won the 1945–46 Primeira Liga, making them the first club other than the Big Three to win the league title. Os Belenenses has also won six Championship of Portugal/Portuguese Cup trophies, and is the fifth most decorated team in Portuguese football.

Until 1982, Os Belenenses was one of four teams that had never been relegated from the first division. Nowadays, it is the team with the fourth most seasons in the Primeira Liga as well as the team with the fifth most points in the championship's history.

Os Belenenses was the first Portuguese team with a turf pitch and artificial lighting, and was also the first Portuguese club to participate in the UEFA Europa League.

The main sports of the club are football, handball, basketball, futsal, athletics, and rugby union. The club has won national championships in all these sports, but it remains best known for football, its original activity. In the club's history, Os Belenenses has won more than 10,000 trophies, including the first divisions of football, handball, basketball, rugby, and the Portuguese Cup in football and futsal, among other sports.

History

Early years
Founded in 1919, Os Belenenses reached their first Campeonato final in 1926, losing 2–0 to Marítimo, and won the title the next season with a 3–0 win over Vitória de Setúbal and winning a second championship in 1929. The club lost the 1932 title to Porto 2–1 in a replay after a 4–4 draw. The club won its third and final Campeonato in 1933 after defeating Sporting CP 3–1. With three Campeonato wins, Os Belenenses was one of Portugal's "Big Four". Since the advent of the Primeira Liga, Os Belenenses failed to keep up with the other three clubs (Benfica, FC Porto and Sporting CP).

League champions
The club won its only Primeira Liga title in 1945–46, edging Benfica by one point, the first time that a club outside the Big Three won the title. On 14 December 1947, they were the first team to face Real Madrid at their newly inaugurated Santiago Bernabéu Stadium (then called the Nuevo Estadio Chamartín) in a friendly match won 3–1 by Madrid. The club were runners-up in the league for the first time in the 1954–55 season, level on 39 points with Benfica. It was not until 1973 that Os Belenenses finished as runners-up again, 18 points behind Benfica, and they never have since.

European forays
Os Belenenses were the first club to compete in the UEFA Cup in a two-legged 3–3 draw with Hibernian at the Estádio do Restelo in Belém.

The club has also played in the European Cup Winners' Cup. In the 1987–88 UEFA Cup, the club played Barcelona. In the first leg, they lost 2–0 in the Camp Nou, winning 1–0 at the Estádio do Restelo with Mapuata scoring. Os Belenenses won their sixth (and to date last) Taça de Portugal on 28 May 1989, defeating Benfica 2–1. Also that season, they knocked out the holders Bayer Leverkusen from the Cup Winners' Cup.

Downfall and recovery
Os Belenenses were relegated from the Primeira Liga for the first time in 1981–82, and have been relegated three other times since then.

21st century
The 2005–06 season saw Os Belenenses finishing fourth from bottom, which would mean relegation for the team. However, as Gil Vicente had fielded an ineligible player that season, Os Belenenses won a subsequent appeal which saw them remain in the top division with Gil Vincente being relegated instead. On 27 May 2007, Os Belenenses reached their first Taça de Portugal final since their 1989 triumph, but were defeated 1–0 by Sporting CP.

Cabral Ferreira, who served as club president of Os Belenenses from 2005 until 2008, died on 26 February 2008 after a long illness. Os Belenenses were relegated in 2010 to the Segunda Liga, but secured promotion back to the Primeira Liga in March 2013, their longest stint out of the top division.

During the 2014–15 season, Os Belenenses finished the championship in sixth place, thereby returning to European competition, qualifying for the 2015–16 UEFA Europa League.

They reached the group stage of the 2015–16 UEFA Europa League after eliminating IFK Göteborg (2–1 on aggregate) and Rheindorf Altach (1–0 on aggregate). They finished fourth and last in their group, recording a surprising 2–1 away win against Basel, but drawing 0–0 twice against Lech Poznań, losing the return match against Basel, and losing both matches to Fiorentina.

Club split

At the end of 2017–18 season, CF Os Belenenses (club) and Belenenses SAD went their separate ways, as the "Protocol on the use of Estádio do Restelo" ended and the SAD refused to negotiate a new contract with the club. So from the 2018–19 season, Belenenses SAD (the professional team) play their Primeira Liga home games at Estádio Nacional, whereas CF Os Belenenses registered an amateur team in 1ª Divisão Distrital de Lisboa, the equivalent to the Sixth Division (lowest Portuguese division), with the support of the majority of fans and club members.

As a consequence, Belenenses SAD was legally forbidden from using Belenenses' logo and name and now uses a new logo (along with being renamed to B-SAD after the 2021–22 season). In the first games of the season, the professional team saw home attendances of only a few hundred, whereas the new, amateur team saw home attendances of approximately 5,000, reversing a long decline in attendance figures.

Honours

Domestic
 Primeira Liga
Winners (1): 1945–46

 Taça de Portugal
Winners (3): 1941–42, 1959–60, 1988–89
Runners-up (5): 1939–40, 1940–41, 1947–48, 1985–86, 2006–07

Supertaça Cândido de Oliveira
Runners-up (1): 1989

 Campeonato de Portugal
Winners (3): 1926–27, 1928–29, 1932–33
Runners-up (3): 1925–26, 1931–32, 1935–36

 Segunda Divisão / Segunda Liga
Winners (2): 1983–84, 2012–13

 Lisbon FA 1ª Divisão
Winners (2): 2018–19, 2020–21

 Lisbon Championship
Winners (6): 1925–26, 1928–29, 1929–30, 1931–32, 1943–44, 1945–46

European
 Intertoto Cup
Winners (1): 1975

League and cup history

CL=Campeonato da Liga (winners weren't considered Portuguese champions);1D=First Division/League2D=Second Division/League;2H=Liga de HonraCWC=Cup Winners' Cup;UC=UEFA CupFC=Fairs Cup;LAT=Latin Cup;IC=Intertoto CupCP=Campeonato de Portugal (4th tier of Portuguese football);L.1D=Lisbon FA 1st Division (Lisbon's 3rd level in 2018-19 and 1st level in 2020–21);L.2D=Lisbon FA 2st Division (Lisbon's 2nd level in 2019–20);L3=Liga 3

European record

Notes
 1R: First round
 2R: Second round
 3Q: Third qualifying round
 PO: Play-off round
1 Barcelona progressed to the second round after winning a play-off match 3–2.
2 Shelbourne progressed to the second round after winning a play-off match 2–1.
3 Velež Mostar progressed to the third round after winning a penalty shoot-out 4–3.

Former coaches

 Cândido de Oliveira (1937–38)
 Lippo Hertzka (1939–40)
 Alejandro Scopelli (1939–41)
 Sándor Peics (1943–44)
 Alejandro Scopelli (1947–48)
 Artur Quaresma (1948–49)
 Sándor Peics (1950–51)
 Fernando Vaz (1951–53)
 Fernando Riera (1954–57)
 Helenio Herrera (1957–58)
 Fernando Vaz (1958–59)
 Otto Glória (1959–61)
 Fernando Vaz (1962–64)
 Ángel Zubieta (1964)
 Franz Fuchs (1 July 1964 – 30 June 1965)
 Ángel Zubieta (1968–69)
 Mário Wilson (1968–70)
 Alejandro Scopelli (1972–74)
 Juca (1 July 1979 – 30 June 1980)
 Jimmy Hagan (1980–81)
 Artur Jorge (1981)
 Nelo Vingada (1 July 1981 – 30 June 1982)
 José Mourinho Félix (1982–83)
 Jimmy Melia (1983–86)
 Marinho Peres (1988–89)
 John Mortimore (1988–89)
 Hristo Mladenov (1989)
 Antônio Lopes (1990)
 Henri Depireux (1990–1991)
 Abel Braga (1992–93)
 José Romão (1993–94)
 João Alves (1994–96)
 Quinito (1996)
 Stoycho Mladenov (1997)
 Manuel Cajuda (1 July 1997–98)
 Vítor Oliveira (1998–00)
 Marinho Peres (2000–03)
 Manuel José (11 Feb 2003 – 22 Nov 2003)
 Vladislav Bogićević (26 Nov 2003 – 20 Jan 2004)
 Augusto Inácio (20 Jan 2004 – 12 May 2004)
 Carlos Carvalhal (21 May 2004 – 27 Oct 2005)
 José Couceiro (28 Oct 2005 – 7 May 2006)
 Jorge Jesus (12 May 2006 – 19 May 2008)
 Casemiro Mior (1 July 2008 – 8 Oct 2008)
 Jaime Pacheco (9 Oct 2008 – 11 May 2009)
 Rui Jorge (12 May 2009 – 25 May 2009)
 João Carlos Pereira (4 June 2009 – 21 Dec 2009)
 António Conceição (23 Dec 2009 – 9 May 2010)
 Baltemar Brito (5 June 2010 – 6 July 2010)
 Rui Gregório (8 July 2010 – 26 Oct 2010)
 Filgueira (interim) (27 Oct 2010 – 1 Nov 2010)
 José Mota (2 Nov 2010 – 14 Feb 2012)
 Marco Paulo (15 Feb 2012 – 14 May 2012)
 Mitchell van der Gaag (1 July 2012 – 26 Sept 2013)
 Marco Paulo (interim) (26 Sept 2013 – 18 March 2014)
 Lito Vidigal (20 March 2014 – 17 March 2015)
 Milos Dukic (18 March 2015 – 30 June 2015)
 Ricardo Sá Pinto (1 July 2015 – 15 December 2015)
 Julio Velázquez (17 December 2015 – 6 October 2016)
 Domingos Paciência (20 April 2017 – 16 January 2018)
 Silas (19 January 2018 – 30 June 2018)
 Nuno Oliveira (20 July 2018 – )

See also
C.F. Os Belenenses (basketball)
C.F. Os Belenenses (futsal)
C.F. Os Belenenses (handball)
C.F. Os Belenenses (rugby union)
B-SAD
CSA Steaua București (football)

References

External links
 

 
Association football clubs established in 1919
Belenenses
Multi-sport clubs in Portugal
1919 establishments in Portugal
Taça de Portugal winners
Primeira Liga clubs
Liga Portugal 2 clubs